The Molly Brown House Museum (also known as House of Lions) is a house in Denver, Colorado, United States that was the home of American philanthropist, activist, and socialite Margaret Brown. She survived the sinking of the RMS Titanic and was known as the “Heroine of the Titanic” for her service to survivors. She later became known as "The Unsinkable Molly Brown". The museum is her former home and presents exhibits interpreting her life, Victorian Denver and historic preservation. The house was listed on the National Register of Historic Places in 1972. It is designated as a Denver Landmark.

History
The house was built in 1889 and designed by the well-known architect William A. Lang, incorporating several popular styles of the period, including Queen Anne style architecture in the United States and Richardsonian Romanesque for the original owners Isaac and Mary Large. After the repeal of the Sherman Silver Purchase Act in 1893, the Large family sold the house. It was purchased by James Joseph Brown (J.J.), Margaret's husband, in 1894 for US$30,000 and the title was transferred to Margaret in 1898, possibly due to J.J.'s deteriorating health.

Margaret and the family traveled frequently, and so the house was often rented out. In 1902, it was the governor's mansion for the Governor of Colorado and his family (Margaret invited the governor and his family to use her home while the governor's mansion was undergoing remodeling). In 1926, Margaret turned the home into a boarding house under the supervision of her housekeeper. The house was sold after Margaret's death in 1932, for $6,000. The home then became a rooming house for men, a Jane Addams Hull House settlement, and rooms and apartments for rent.

Restoration
The house continued to deteriorate and by 1970 concerns arose about its impending demolition, but a group of concerned citizens formed Historic Denver, Inc., raising the funds for the house to be restored to its former glory. While restoring the home, the group used architectural research, paint chip analysis, and original photographs taken in 1910 as guides.  The home is owned by Historic Denver, Inc., and public tours are run daily for a fee.

See also
 The Molly Brown Summer House

References

External links

Museum official website

Historic Denver official website

Colorado State Register of Historic Properties
Historic house museums in Colorado
Houses completed in 1887
Houses in Denver
Houses on the National Register of Historic Places in Colorado
Molly Brown House
National Register of Historic Places in Denver
James Joseph Brown family residences
1887 establishments in Colorado
Denver landmarks